The Eastern Gemini Seamount, also known as Oscostar, is a seamount in the southwestern Pacific Ocean, about halfway between Vanuatu's Tanna and Matthew Islands. The only recorded eruption from Eastern Gemini was observed by a passing ship on February 18, 1996 when bursts of very dark water were observed.

See also
List of volcanoes in French Southern and Antarctic Lands

References

Volcanoes of Vanuatu
Seamounts of the Pacific Ocean
Active volcanoes
Volcanoes of Oceania
Volcanoes of the Pacific Ocean
Volcanoes of France